Chthonerpeton viviparum is a species of caecilian in the family Typhlonectidae. It is endemic to southern Brazil and only known from the vicinity of Joinville, in the eastern Santa Catarina State. The common name Santa Catarina caecilian has been coined for it.

Chthonerpeton viviparum is an aquatic species living in standing bodies of water. However, its ecology is poorly known. It might be threatened by water pollution from agricultural and industrial sources.

References

viviparum
Endemic fauna of Brazil
Amphibians of Brazil
Taxa named by Hampton Wildman Parker
Taxa named by Otto von Wettstein
Amphibians described in 1929
Taxonomy articles created by Polbot